Faro's Daughter is a Georgian romance novel by Georgette Heyer, was first published in 1941. The story is set in 1795.

Plot summary
The beautiful but poor Deborah Grantham presides over her aunt's gaming house in Georgian London. Here she meets Max Ravenscar, who is determined to prevent his young cousin Lord Mablethorpe from contracting an inappropriate marriage to Grantham. Incensed by the idea that she would exploit an innocent, Deborah decides to take her revenge on Ravenscar, which eventually leads to the pair falling in love.

Characters
Miss Deborah Grantham - the heroine, 25, a beautiful and clever but penniless young lady who resides with her aunt (Lady Bellingham), who runs a gaming house.

Mr Max Ravenscar - the lead male character, 35, a member of Brooks's and a notable whip; is very wealthy and is a trustee of his cousin (Lord Mablethorpe)'s fortune. Domineering and clever, likes to gamble.

Adrian, Lord Mablethorpe - cousin of Mr Ravenscar; he is youthfully in love with Deb Grantham and wishes to marry her, to his family's distress. He has almost reached his majority.

Eliza, Lady Bellingham - Deb Grantham's aunt, Sir Edward Bellingham's penniless widow. Resided previously in Clarges St, before opening the gaming house in St. James's Square to endeavor to pay her bills.

Lord Ormskirk - the antihero, wishes to make Miss Grantham his mistress.

Selina, Lady Mablethorpe - Lord Adrian's mother, seeks Mr Ravenscar's help to prevent her son from marrying Deb Grantham.

Sir James Filey - wishes to race his pair of blood chestnut horses against Mr Ravenscar's famous greys.

Arabella Ravenscar - Max Ravenscar's sister. She is a minx.

Mr Kit Grantham  - Deb's brother, in a line regiment, in love with Arabella Ravenscar.

Mr Lucius Kennett - adventurer, friend of Deb Grantham, willing to assist her in various plots and schemes.

See also
 Faro Ladies

References

1941 British novels
Novels by Georgette Heyer
Historical romance novels
Fiction set in 1795
Novels set in the 1790s
Heinemann (publisher) books